Kilen is a village in Kristiansand municipality in Agder county, Norway. The village is located in the Finsland area in the northern part of the municipality on the east coast of the lake Livatnet.

References

Villages in Agder
Geography of Kristiansand